Hugh Manson Dorsey (July 10, 1871 – June 11, 1948) was an American lawyer who was notable as the prosecuting attorney in the Leo Frank prosecution of 1913, that subsequently led to a lynching after Frank's death sentence was reduced to life imprisonment. He was also a politician, a member of the Democratic Party, who was twice elected as the Governor of Georgia (1917–1921) and jurist who served for more than a decade as a superior court judge (1935–1948) in Atlanta.

Early life and education
Hugh Manson Dorsey was born in Fayetteville, Georgia on July 10, 1871 to Sarah Matilda (née Bennett) and Rufus T. Dorsey. At the age of 8, he moved with his family in 1879 to Atlanta. His father was a judge and after moving to Atlanta formed the firm Wright and Dorsey with Judge William Wright. Dorsey attended local Atlanta schools. He attended school for a year in Hartwell, Georgia before returning to Atlanta.

Dorsey graduated from the University of Georgia in 1893 with a Bachelor of Arts. After studying law at the University of Virginia, he was admitted to the bar in Fayetteville.

Personal life
Dorsey married Adair Wilkinson of Valdosta, Georgia on June 29, 1911. Together, they had two sons, Hugh Manson Dorsey Jr. and James Wilkinson Dorsey.

Dorsey's sister, Sarah, married Luther Rosser Jr., son of attorney Luther Rosser, who was chief counsel defending Leo Frank at trial and subsequent appeals.

Career
Dorsey joined his father's law firm in Atlanta in 1895. He was made a partner along with Arthur Heyman and the firm became Dorsey, Brewster, Howell and Heyman. After his father died in 1909, Dorsey became the head of the firm and remained until he withdrew from the partnership in August 1916.

After working for several years with his father, in 1910, Dorsey was appointed solicitor general of the Atlanta Judicial Circuit by Governor Joseph M. Brown after the death of Charles D. Hill. He was a member of the Democratic Party, as were most established Whites in the South after Reconstruction. In 1913, Dorsey was prosecuting attorney (serving as the solicitor general of the Fulton County Superior Court) at the trial of Leo Frank, who was indicted for the murder of young factory worker Mary Phagan. Achieving conviction amid intense media coverage, Dorsey became famous. Frank, a Jewish northerner from Brooklyn, was eventually lynched by a mob two months after Governor John Slaton commuted his death sentence to life in prison.

Dorsey's victory in the Frank-Phagan case contributed to his political popularity. He resigned as solicitor general on August 1, 1916. He was elected for two consecutive two-year terms as the Governor of Georgia from 1917 to 1921.

Perhaps the most remarkable moment of Dorsey's governorship came on April 22, 1921, when he gave a speech entitled "A Statement from Governor Hugh M. Dorsey as to the Negro in Georgia." It was near the end of his final term as governor; he had also just badly lost a race for the U.S. Senate to his former ally Tom Watson, by that point a vocal white supremacist. Dorsey's speech recited a litany of abuses by Georgia whites against African Americans: lynchings, banishments, slavery-like peonage, and physical cruelty. "To me it seems that we stand indicted as a people before the world," he said. "If these charges should continue, both God and man would justly condemn Georgia more severely than man and God have condemned Belgium and Leopold for the Congo atrocities."

These were astonishing admissions from any white Democratic governor in the Jim Crow South — much less one who'd made his name with the Leo Frank prosecution. His already-elected successor, Thomas Hardwick, called it "an infamous slander on the State." Historians have debated Dorsey's motivations — from an honest desire for reform to slowing the early stages of the Great Migration to improving Georgia's perception in the eyes of Northern capitalists.

In 1926, he was appointed judge of the civil division in Atlanta. Dorsey served as a superior court judge in Atlanta from 1935 to March 4, 1948. He served on the Atlanta Judicial Circuit.

Death and legacy
Dorsey died on June 11, 1948 in a hospital in Atlanta. He was buried in Westview Cemetery in Atlanta. His grandson, Jaz Dorsey, was a composer, lyricist and playwright.

Over the decades, the dramatic story of Frank's trial and lynching (after his death sentence was commuted) was adapted into many forms.  He is seen in the 1964 fiction Profiles in Courage and 1988 TV-miniseries The Murder of Mary Phagan, where Dorsey was portrayed by the actor Richard Jordan, and in the Broadway musical Parade, where he was portrayed in the original cast by Herndon Lackey.

References

Sources

External links
 
 Arguments of Hugh M. Dorsey in the 1913 Leo Frank Murder Trial Some of Solicitor General Hugh Manson Dorsey's nine hours of closing arguments made on Aug. 22, 23 and 25, 1913 in the Atlanta Judicial Circuit. Held at Internet Archive in Adobe PDF format, 146 pages.
 Georgia State Archives Roster of State Governors
 Georgia Governor's Gravesites Field Guide (1776–2003)
 Hugh M. Dorsey historical marker
 

1871 births
1948 deaths
Georgia (U.S. state) lawyers
Georgia (U.S. state) state court judges
Democratic Party governors of Georgia (U.S. state)
Politicians from Atlanta
Burials in Georgia (U.S. state)
University of Georgia alumni
Methodists from Georgia (U.S. state)
People from Fayetteville, Georgia
20th-century American politicians